RSL-3, in Cavalier County, North Dakota near Concrete, was listed on the National Register of Historic Places in 2018.

It is located at 12329 ND 5.

It is a Remote Sprint Launch facility, part of the Safeguard missile defense program.

According to the Minot Daily News,RSL-3 near Concrete is one of four Remote Sprint Launch sites that were built as part of the Stanley R. Mickelsen Safeguard Complex in northeastern North Dakota. The complex was the only anti-ballistic missile defense facility ever built in the United States. Its existence has been credited by Cold War historians as playing a major role in the Strategic Arms Limitation Talks Treaties with the Soviet Union. The site is significant at the national level for its role in the Cold War and the advancements in technology that stemmed from the project.

Site is open for public tours.

References

Military facilities on the National Register of Historic Places in North Dakota
National Register of Historic Places in Cavalier County, North Dakota
Anti-ballistic missiles of the United States
Missile launchers